Little River may refer to several places:

Australia

Streams

New South Wales
Little River (Dubbo), source in the Dubbo region, a tributary of the Macquarie River
Little River (Oberon), source in the Oberon Shire, a tributary of Coxs River (Hawkesbury–Nepean catchment)
Little River (Wingecarribee), source in the Wingecarribee Shire, a tributary of Burke River (Hawkesbury–Nepean catchment)
Little River (Wollondilly), source in the Wollondilly Shire,  a tributary of Nattai River (Hawkesbury–Nepean catchment)
Boyd River (New South Wales), also known as Little River during the 19th century (Clarence River catchment)
Goobarragandra River, a major tributary of Tumut River, was also known as Tumut Little River and sometimes Little River
Goodradigbee River, was also known as Little River and, until 1970, it was officially Goodradigbee (or Little) River
Mongarlowe River, also known as Little River, during the 19th century (Shoalhaven River catchment)

Victoria
Little River (Avon, West Gippsland), in the Avon Wilderness Park
Little River (Cathedral Range), in the Cathedral Range
Little River (Greater Geelong), in the City of Greater Geelong
Little River (Moroka River, Victoria), reaches its confluence with the Moroka River in the Alpine National Park
Little River (Snowy River National Park), reaches its confluence in the Snowy River National Park
Little River (Sydenham Inlet, East Gippsland), reaches its mouth at the Sydenham Inlet
Little River (Tambo River, East Gippsland, Victoria), reaches its confluence with the Tambo River in East Gippsland
Teal Creek, formerly known as the Little River, reaches its mouth at the Mallacoota Inlet

Queensland 
 Little River, a tributary of the Gilbert River in Far North Queensland
 Little River, a tributary of the Hodgkinson River, in Far North Queensland. (part of the Mitchell River catchment)

Tasmania 
 The Little River, a tributary of the Nive River (part of the River Derwent catchment)

Communities
Little River, New South Wales, a locality in the valley of the Goobarragandra River, near Tumut
Little River, Victoria, a  township near Geelong

Canada

Streams
Little River (Cariboo River tributary), a river in the Cariboo region, British Columbia
Little River (Little Shuswap Lake), a short connecting waterway in British Columbia, between Shuswap Lake and Little Shuswap Lake
Little River (Vancouver Island), a stream in the Comox Valley region, in British Columbia
Little River (Northern Peninsula, Newfoundland), see List of rivers of Newfoundland and Labrador

Communities
Little River, British Columbia, in the Comox Valley area of Vancouver Island
Little River, Cumberland County, Nova Scotia
Little River, Digby, Nova Scotia
Little River, Victoria County, Nova Scotia
Little River Harbour, Nova Scotia, in Yarmouth County
Little River, Yukon

United States

Communities
Little River, Baldwin County, Alabama
Little River, Cherokee County, Alabama
Little River County, Arkansas
Little River, California, Mendocino County
Little River (Miami), a neighborhood within the city of Miami
Little River, Kansas, Rice County

Little River, South Carolina, Horry County
Little River-Academy, Texas, Bell County
Little River, Wisconsin, Oconto County

Streams

Arkansas
Little River (St. Francis River tributary), a tributary of the St. Francis River
Little River (Red River tributary), a tributary of the Red River

California
Little River (Mendocino County), a river in Mendocino County
Little River (Humboldt County), a river in Humboldt County

Florida
Little River (Biscayne Bay), flowing into Biscayne Bay
Little River (Ochlockonee River tributary), a tributary of the Ochlockonee River

Georgia
Little River (Columbia County, Georgia), a tributary of the Savannah River
Little River (Etowah River tributary), a tributary of the Etowah River
Little River (Oconee River tributary), a tributary of the Oconee River
Little River (Withlacoochee River tributary), a tributary of the Withlacoochee River (North)

Michigan
Little River (Big Bay de Noc)
Little River (Menominee River tributary), a tributary of the Menominee River

Missouri

Little River (St. Francis River tributary), a tributary of the St. Francis River in southeastern Missouri and northeastern Arkansas

Virginia
Little River (North Anna River tributary), in Hanover and Louisa counties
Little River (Clinch River tributary), in Russell and Tazewell counties
Little River (Goose Creek tributary), in Fauquier and Loudoun counties
Little River (New River tributary), in Floyd, Montgomery, and Pulaski counties
Little River (North River tributary), two streams that flow within the George Washington National Forest

Other streams in the United States
Little River Canyon National Preserve, Alabama
Little River (Shetucket River tributary), a tributary of the Shetucket River, Connecticut
Little River (Delaware), flowing into Delaware Bay, Delaware
Little River (Indiana), a tributary of the Wabash River, Indiana
Little River (Kentucky), a tributary of the Cumberland River, Kentucky
Little River (Louisiana), a tributary of the Ouachita River, Louisiana
Little River (Maine), several rivers in Maine
Little River (Saint Louis River), a tributary of the Saint Louis River, Minnesota
Little River (Merrimack River tributary), a tributary of the Merrimack River, Massachusetts and New Hampshire
Little River (New Hampshire), several rivers in New Hampshire
Little River (Oregon), a list of rivers in Oregon
Little River (Grass River tributary), a tributary of the Grass River, New York
Little River (North Carolina), several rivers in North Carolina
Little River (Oklahoma), a list of rivers in Oklahoma
Little River (South Carolina), a list of rivers in South Carolina
Little River (Tennessee), a tributary of the Tennessee River, Tennessee
Little River (Texas), a tributary of the Brazos River, Texas

Other communities
Fiumicino (Italian for "Little River"), a town and comune near Rome, Italy
Little River, New Zealand, a town on Banks Peninsula in the Canterbury region of New Zealand

Other streams
Little River (Grenada), a river in Grenada
Little River (New Zealand), a river in New Zealand
Little River (Somerset), a tributary of the River Barle, Somerset, England

See also

La Petite Rivière (disambiguation)
Little River Township (disambiguation)
Little River Railroad (disambiguation)
Little Red River (disambiguation)
Little River, Alabama (disambiguation)
Rio Pequeno (disambiguation)
Little River Station in Christchurch